Charles Roy "Curly" Brown (December 9, 1888 – June 10, 1968) was a professional baseball player.  He was a left-handed pitcher over parts of four seasons (1911–13, 1915) with the St. Louis Browns and Cincinnati Reds.  For his career, he compiled a 3–8 record, with a 4.20 earned run average, and 52 strikeouts in 128⅔ innings pitched.

External links

1888 births
1968 deaths
St. Louis Browns players
Cincinnati Reds players
Major League Baseball pitchers
Baseball players from Kansas
Burlington Pathfinders players
Montgomery Rebels players
Birmingham Barons players
San Francisco Seals (baseball) players
Los Angeles Angels (minor league) players
Denver Bears players
Dallas Steers players
Rochester Tribe players
People from Spring Hill, Kansas
Goldsboro Giants players